At the Battle of Naxos (376 BC) the new Athenian fleet of Chabrias decisively defeated the Spartans. This was the beginning of Athens's recovery of its Aegean hegemony following its loss in the Peloponnesian War. The victory was decided by Phocion's courageous and skillful action on the left wing. In western waters another great Athenian commander, Timotheus, won the battle of Alyzia against Sparta in 374 BC.

References 

376 BC
Naxos
Naxos 376 BC
Naxos 376 BC
Ancient Naxos